Cheo may refer to:

People
 Cheo Hodari Coker (born 1972) U.S. TV producer
 Cheo Feliciano (1935-2014) Puerto Rican singer
 Cheo Hurtado (born 1960) Venezuelan musician

 Jose "Cheo" Cruz (born 1947) Puerto Rican baseball player
 "Cheo" José Marcelino Díaz Marquetti  (1909-1967) Cuban singer

 Cheo Chai Chen, Singaporean politician

Fictional characters 
 Cheo (Prison Break), a character from Prison Break, see List of Prison Break minor characters

Other
 Chèo, Vietnamese satirical musical theatre
 Children's Hospital of Eastern Ontario (CHEO; Ottawa Children's Hospital) Canada